Hagler is an unincorporated community in Fayette County, in the U.S. state of Ohio.

History
A post office called Hagler was established in 1886, and remained in operation until 1906. The community has the name of Jesse and William Hagler, original owners of the town site.

References

Unincorporated communities in Fayette County, Ohio
Unincorporated communities in Ohio